Georgios Savvas (Greek: Γεώργιος Σάββας) was a Greek revolutionary chieftain of the Macedonian Struggle.

Biography 
Savvas was born in the 1880s in Thessaloniki. He participated in an armed group at Olympus at the beginning of the Macedonian Struggle. He soon became a leader of a small group. There he met with Konstantinos Mazarakis-Ainian and at the end of 1905, Mazarakis asked him to move with his team in Mariovo after the damage the Greek bodies suffered there. There, expanding his body, he cooperated with Captain Theodosis, Kapetan Garefis and Em. Katsigaris. He acted in the area of Mariovo and Almopia throughout the Macedonian Struggle, persecuting the Bulgarian groups.

Sources 
 Hellenic Army General Staff, Army History Directorate, Ο Μακεδονικός Αγών και τα εις Θράκην γεγονότα, Athens 1979, p. 181, 223
 John S. Koliopoulos (editor), Αφανείς, γηγενείς Μακεδονομάχοι, Εταιρεία Μακεδονικών Σπουδών, University Studio Press, Thessaloniki, 2008, p. 55
 Μακεδονικός Αγώνας, Η έναρξη του Αγώνα, οι μάχες κατά την διάρκειά του και η πορεία των πρωταγωνιστών που έλαβαν μέρος.

Greek people of the Macedonian Struggle
Greek Macedonians
Military personnel from Thessaloniki
Macedonian revolutionaries (Greek)
1880s births

Year of birth uncertain
Year of death missing
Greek people from the Ottoman Empire